Glendalough is a former monastic settlement in County Wicklow, Ireland.

Glendalough may also refer to:
The former Diocese of Glendalough
The current Diocese of Dublin and Glendalough
Glendalough, Rosewood, a heritage-listed villa in Rosewood, City of Ipswich, Queensland, Australia
Glendalough State Park, Minnesota, US
Glendalough, Western Australia, a suburb of Perth
Electoral district of Glendalough
Glendalough railway station
Bodleian Library, MS Rawlinson B 502, sometimes called The Book of Glendalough